Manchali is an administrative ward in the Dodoma Rural district of the Dodoma Region of Tanzania. In 2016 the Tanzania National Bureau of Statistics report there were 11,395 people in the ward, from 10,485 in 2012.

References

Wards of Dodoma Region